African Americans are a demographic minority in the United States. The first achievements by African Americans in various fields historically marked footholds, often leading to more widespread cultural change. The shorthand phrase for this is "breaking the color barrier".

This is a list of African-American firsts in the fine arts, popular arts, and literature. It is a wider listing than that of the major national firsts at List of African-American firsts.

18th century

1746 
 First known African-American (and slave) to compose a work of literature: Lucy Terry with her poem "Bars Fight", composed in 1746 and first published in 1855 in Josiah Holland's "History of Western Massachusetts

1760 
 First known African-American published author: Jupiter Hammon (poem "An Evening Thought: Salvation by Christ with Penitential Cries", published as a broadside)

1773 
 First known African-American woman to publish a book: Phillis Wheatley (Poems on Various Subjects, Religious and Moral)

19th century

1825 
 First African-American actor to play Othello on an English and then continental stages - First African-American star - best paid actor : Ira Aldridge

1827 
 First African-American owned-and-operated newspaper: Freedom's Journal, founded in New York City by Rev. Peter Williams Jr. and other free blacks.

1858 
 First published play by an African American: The Escape; or, A Leap for Freedom by William Wells Brown

1890 
 First African American to record a best-selling phonograph record: George Washington Johnson, "The Laughing Song" and "The Whistling Coon."
First woman and African American to earn a military pension for their own military service: Ann Bradford Stokes.

1892 
 First African American to sing at Carnegie Hall: Matilda Sissieretta Joyner Jones

20th century

1903 
 First Broadway musical written by African Americans, and the first to star African Americans: In Dahomey

1910 
 First African-American woman millionaire: Madam C. J. Walker
 First African-American female to be recorded commercially: Daisy Tapley (Recording source- Library of Congress)

1927 
 First African American to star in an international motion picture: Josephine Baker in La Sirène des tropiques.

1931 
 First African-American composer to have their symphony performed by a leading orchestra: William Grant Still, Symphony No. 1, by Rochester Philharmonic Orchestra

1935 
 First known interracial jazz group: Benny Goodman Trio (Benny Goodman, Teddy Wilson, Gene Krupa)

1936 
 First African American to conduct a major U.S. orchestra: William Grant Still (Los Angeles Philharmonic)

1939 
 First African American to star in their own television program: Ethel Waters, The Ethel Waters Show, on NBC

1940 

 First African American to win an Oscar: Hattie McDaniel (Best Supporting Actress, Gone with the Wind, 1939)

1941 
 First African American to give a White House Command Performance: Josh White

1943 
 First African-American artists to have a number-one hit on the Billboard charts: Mills Brothers ("Paper Doll"), topped "Best Sellers in Stores" chart on November 6 (See also: Tommy Edwards, 1958; The Platters, 1959)

1944 
 First known African-American comic book artist: Matt Baker in Jumbo Comics #69 for Fiction House

1945 
 First African-American member of the New York City Opera: Todd Duncan

1947 
 First African-American artist to receive sole credit for a #1 hit on the Billboard charts: Count Basie ("Open the Door, Richard"), topped "Best Sellers in Stores" chart on February 22 (See also: Mills Brothers, 1943; Nat King Cole, 1950; Tommy Edwards, 1958; The Platters, 1959)
 First comic book produced entirely by African-Americans: All-Negro Comics

1948 
 First African-American man to receive an Oscar: James Baskett (Honorary Academy Award for his portrayal of "Uncle Remus" in Song of the South, 1946) (See also: Sidney Poitier, 1964)
 First African-American composer to have an opera performed by a major U.S. company: William Grant Still (Troubled Island, New York City Opera)
 First known African-American star of a regularly scheduled network television series: Bob Howard, The Bob Howard Show (See also: 1956)
 First African American to star in a network television sitcom: Amanda Randolph, The Laytons

1949 
 First African-American-owned and -operated radio station: WERD, established October 3, 1949 in Atlanta, Georgia by Jesse B. Blayton Sr.

1950 
 First African American to win a Tony Award: Juanita Hall (Best Featured Actress in a Musical, South Pacific)
 First African American to win a Pulitzer Prize: Gwendolyn Brooks (Book of poetry, Annie Allen, 1949)
 First African-American solo singer to have a #1 hit on the Billboard charts: Nat King Cole ("Mona Lisa"), topped "Best Sellers in Stores" chart on July 15 (See also: Mills Brothers, 1943; Count Basie, 1947; Tommy Edwards, 1958; The Platters, 1959)

1954 
 First African-American woman to be nominated for the Academy Award for Best Actress: Dorothy Dandridge (Carmen Jones, 1954).
 First individual African-American woman as subject on the cover of Life magazine: Dorothy Dandridge, November 1, 1954

1955 
 First African-American member of the Metropolitan Opera: Marian Anderson
 First African-American male dancer in a major ballet company: Arthur Mitchell (New York City Ballet); also first African-American principal dancer of a major ballet company (NYCB), 1956. (See also: 1969)
 First African-American singer to appear in a telecast opera: Leontyne Price in NBC's production of Tosca

1956 
 First African-American star of a nationwide network TV show: Nat King Cole of The Nat King Cole Show, NBC (See also: 1948)

1957 
 First African-American to win the Best Actor Award at the Cannes Film Festival: John Kitzmiller (Dolina Miru)

1958 
 First African American to reach number 1 on the Billboard Hot 100: Tommy Edwards ("It's All in the Game"), September 29 (See also: The Platters, 1959)

1959 
 First African-American Grammy Award winners, in the award's inaugural year: Ella Fitzgerald and Count Basie (two awards each)
 First African-American group to reach #1 on the Billboard Hot 100: The Platters ("Smoke Gets in Your Eyes"), January 19 (See also: Tommy Edwards, 1958)

1960

1961 
 First African-American woman to perform at a presidential inauguration: Opera singer Marian Anderson at John F. Kennedy's inauguration
 First African-American tenor to sing leading roles for the Metropolitan Opera: George Shirley

1963 
 First African American to appear as a series regular on a primetime dramatic television series: Cicely Tyson, "East Side/West Side" (CBS). 
 First African American to be nominated for a Primetime Emmy Award: Diahann Carroll, for Outstanding Single Performance by an Actress in a Lead Role, for episode "A Horse Has a Big Head, Let Him Worry" of Naked City (See also: 1968)

1964 
 First movie with African-American interracial marriage: One Potato, Two Potato, actors Bernie Hamilton and Barbara Barrie, written by Orville H. Hampton, Raphael Hayes, directed by Larry Peerce

1965 
 First African-American nationally syndicated cartoonist: Morrie Turner (Wee Pals)
 First African-American title character of a comic book series: Lobo (Dell Comics). (See also: The Falcon, 1969, and Luke Cage, 1972)
 First African-American star of a network television drama: Bill Cosby, I Spy (co-star with Robert Culp)
 First African-American cast member of a daytime soap opera: Micki Grant who played Peggy Nolan Harris on Another World until 1972.
 First African-American Playboy Playmate centerfold: Jennifer Jackson (March issue)

1966 
 First African-American male to be nominated for a Primetime Emmy Award and first African-American to win a Primetime Emmy Award: Bill Cosby, I Spy
 First African-American model on the cover of a Vogue (British Vogue) magazine: Donyale Luna

1967 
 First African-American interracial kiss on network television: entertainers Nancy Sinatra (Italian-American) and Sammy Davis Jr. (African-American) on Sinatra's variety special Movin' With Nancy, airing December 11 on NBC (See also: 1968)

1968 
 First African-American interracial kiss on a network television drama: Uhura, played by Nichelle Nichols (African-American), and Captain Kirk, played by William Shatner (white Canadian): Star Trek: "Plato's Stepchildren" (See also: 1967)
 First fine-arts museum devoted to African-American work: Studio Museum in Harlem
 First African-American actress to star in her own television series where she did not play a domestic worker: Diahann Carroll in Julia (see also: 1963)
 First African-American starring character of a comic strip: Danny Raven in Dateline: Danger! by Al McWilliams and John Saunders.
 First African-American actor to star in the lead role on a TV western series: Otis Young in The Outcasts

1969 
 First African-American superhero: The Falcon, Marvel Comics' Captain America #117 (September 1969). (See also: Lobo, 1965 and Luke Cage, 1972)
 First African-American director of a major Hollywood motion picture: Gordon Parks (The Learning Tree)
 First African-American founder of a classical training school and company of ballet: Arthur Mitchell, Dance Theatre of Harlem (See also: 1955)
 First African-American woman to appear on the Grand Ole Opry: Linda Martell

1970 
 First African-American woman to win a Primetime Emmy Award: Gail Fisher, for Outstanding Supporting Actress in a Drama Series, for Mannix (see also: 1971)

1971 
 First African American to win a Golden Globe Award: Gail Fisher for Mannix (see also: 1970)
 First African American to appear by herself on the cover of Playboy: Darine Stern (October issue)

1972 
 First African-American superhero to star in own comic-book series: Luke Cage, Marvel Comics' Luke Cage, Hero for Hire #1 (June 1972). (See also: Lobo, 1965, and the Falcon, 1969)
 First African-American interracial romantic kiss in a mainstream comics magazine: "The Men Who Called Him Monster", by writer Don McGregor (See also: 1975) and artist Luis Garcia, in Warren Publishing's black-and-white horror-comics magazine Creepy #43 (Jan. 1972) (See also: 1975)
 First African-American interracial male kiss on network television: Sammy Davis Jr. (African-American) and Carroll O'Connor (Caucasian) in All in the Family
 First African-American woman Broadway director: Vinnette Justine Carroll (Don't Bother Me, I Can't Cope)
 First African-American comic-book creator to receive a "created by" cover-credit: Wayne Howard (Midnight Tales #1)

1973 
 First African-American Bond villain in a James Bond movie: Yaphet Kotto, playing Mr. Big/Dr. Kananga, Live and Let Die.
 First African-American Bond Girl in a James Bond movie: Gloria Hendry (playing Rosie Carver), Live and Let Die.

1974 
 First African-American model on the cover of American Vogue magazine: Beverly Johnson

1975 
 First African-American interracial couple in a TV-series cast: The Jeffersons, actors Franklin Cover (Caucasian) and Roxie Roker (African-American) as Tom and Helen Willis, respectively; series creator: Norman Lear
 First African-American interracial romantic kiss in a color comic book: Amazing Adventures #31 (July 1975), feature "Killraven: Warrior of the Worlds", characters M'Shulla Scott and Carmilla Frost, by writer Don McGregor and artist P. Craig Russell (See also: 1972)
 First African-American model on the cover of Elle magazine: Beverly Johnson

1980 
 First African-American-oriented cable channel: BET

1982 
 First African American to receive the Pulitzer Prize for Drama: Charles Fuller for A Soldier's Play
 First African-American woman to become a principal dancer of the Pennsylvania Ballet: Debra Austin

1983 
 First African-American artist to have a video shown on MTV: Michael Jackson

1986 
 First African-American musicians inducted into the Rock and Roll Hall of Fame, in the inaugural class: Chuck Berry, James Brown, Ray Charles, Sam Cooke, Fats Domino, and Little Richard

1987 
 First African-American woman, and first woman, inducted into the Rock and Roll Hall of Fame: Aretha Franklin
 First African-American Radio City Music Hall Rockette: Jennifer Jones

1990 
 First African-American woman to become a principal dancer at Houston Ballet: Lauren Anderson
 First African-American Playboy Playmate of the Year: Renee Tenison

1991 
 First African American nominated for the Academy Award for Best Director: John Singleton for Boyz n the Hood

1993 
 First African American woman to win the Nobel Prize for Literature: Toni Morrison
 First African-American woman named Poet Laureate of the United States: Rita Dove; also the youngest person named to that position
 First African- American to be inducted as a member of the Grand Ole Opry: Charley Pride

1994 
 First African-American woman director of a major-studio movie: Darnell Martin (Columbia Pictures' I Like It Like That)

1995 
 First African-American inductee to the National Radio Hall of Fame: Hal Jackson
 First African American, and first person, to have a song to debut at number one on the Billboard Hot 100 chart: Michael Jackson

1997 
 First African-American actor to star in the lead role in a comic-book adaptation movie (Spawn): Michael Jai White

2000 
 First African American to be inducted into the Country Music Hall of Fame: Charley Pride

21st century

2001 
 First African-American woman to win the ASCAP Pop Music Songwriter of the Year award: Beyoncé Knowles

2002 
 First African-American woman to win the Academy Award for Best Actress: Halle Berry

2004 
 First African American to win Broadway theater's Tony Award for Best Lead Actress in a Play: Phylicia Rashad

2009 
 First African American to win the Pulitzer Prize for History: Annette Gordon-Reed, The Hemingses of Monticello: An American Family

2012 
 First African American to direct an animated film with a budget in excess of $100 million: Peter Ramsey (Rise of the Guardians)

2013 
 First African-American president of the Academy of Motion Picture Arts and Sciences: Cheryl Boone Isaacs

2014 
 First African-American woman to be nominated for Best Director by the Golden Globe Awards: Ava DuVernay for Selma

See also 

 List of African-American sports firsts
 List of black Academy Award winners and nominees
 List of black Golden Globe Award winners and nominees
 Timeline of African-American history

Notes

References

African-American
African-American firsts
Social history of the United States
American culture
United States history timelines
Arts-related lists